Jean Klein (October 19, 1912 – February 22, 1998) was a French author, spiritual teacher and philosopher of Advaita Vedanta (Nondualism). According to Jean Klein, it is only in a "spontaneous state of interior silence that we can open ourselves to our true nature: the 'I Am' of pure consciousness."

Biography
Jean Klein was born in Berlin and spent his childhood in Brno and Prague. He studied musicology and medicine in Vienna and Berlin, becoming a physician. Having left Germany in 1933 for France, he secretly worked with the French Resistance in the Second World War. After the war, Klein again left for India to study Yoga and Advaita Vedanta for three years. During those three years he met a spiritual teacher of Advaita, Pandit Veeraraghavachar Rao, a scholar at the Sanskrit College in Bangalore, and returned to the West to become a spiritual teacher himself. He died in 1998 in Santa Barbara, California.

Books
Be Who You Are, 1978, ; 2006, 
Ease of Being, 1986, 
Who Am I? The Sacred Quest, 1988, ; 2006, 
I Am, 1989, ; 2006, 
Transmission of the Flame, 1990, ; 
Open to the Unknown: Dialogues in Delphi, 1993, 
Beyond Knowledge, 1994, ; 2006, 0-9551762-8-X
Living Truth: Where Time and Timelessness Meet, 1995, ; 2007, 
The Book of Listening, 2008,

Magazine
Revue Être

Article 'Propos du vieux Tcheng' ('words from Old Cheng') 'Être', 1974.

External links 
 Jean Klein on Wordpress
 Jean Klein audio recordings
Experiencing the Teaching of Jean Klein:  Teachers of No-Thing & Nothing

References

1912 births
French spiritual writers
Spiritual teachers
20th-century mystics
1998 deaths
French male writers
20th-century French male writers